"Heartbreak Hill" is a song co-written and recorded by American country music artist Emmylou Harris.  It was released in December 1988 as the first single from the album Bluebird.  The song reached number 8 on the Billboard Hot Country Singles & Tracks chart.  The song was written by Harris and Paul Kennerley.

Chart performance

Year-end charts

References

1989 singles
Emmylou Harris songs
Songs written by Paul Kennerley
Reprise Records singles
1988 songs
Songs written by Emmylou Harris